Brother Bear 2 is a 2006 American animated direct-to-video musical fantasy comedy-drama film and the sequel to the animated feature Brother Bear, which was released on August 29, 2006. Melissa Etheridge contributed three songs to the film. In the film, the adventures of bear brothers Kenai and Koda continue. While the first film dealt with Kenai's relationship with Koda, this one focuses more on his bond with a young human from his past, Nita.

Only five of the original characters return for the sequel (excluding Denahi): Kenai, Koda, Rutt, Tuke, and Tug, as Jason Raize died on February 3, 2004. Only four of those actors reprised their original roles: Jeremy Suarez, Rick Moranis, Dave Thomas, and Michael Clarke Duncan. Jason Marsden, as heard in the first trailer, was originally announced to voice Kenai, after being voiced by Joaquin Phoenix in the first film; Patrick Dempsey ultimately voiced the character. However, the end credits still note Marsden as one of the additional voices.

Producer Jim Ballantine was removed from the project and replaced with Carolyn Bates.

Plot 
Picking up several months after the events of the first film, Kenai, now a bear, is living joyfully with his foster brother Koda. Having just awoken from hibernation, the bears begin traveling to Crowberry Ridge for the first berries of the season. However, Kenai is plagued by visions of his childhood friend Nita, to whom he gave a special amulet many years ago after saving her from drowning. Nita, now grown up, is set to wed Atka, a man from a neighboring Inuit village. However, on the day of the wedding, the Spirits appear in the form of a storm that causes a fissure to open up in the ground between Nita and Atka, much to Nita's shock. Believing it to be a sign, Nita consults Innoko, the wisest shaman of the tribes. By communicating with the Spirits, Innoko reveals that the amulet that Kenai gave Nita all those years ago bonded her and Kenai together. The only way for Nita to sever the bond and be able to marry Atka is to find Kenai, go with him to Hokani Falls where he had given her the amulet, and burn the amulet together on the eve of the Equinox, thus returning the bond to the Spirits. Innoko grants Nita the ability to communicate with Kenai and the other wildlife.

Eventually, Kenai and Koda meet up with Nita. At first, Kenai refuses to destroy the bond, but Nita tells him that the Spirits may turn him back into a human and send him to find her. Under pressure from Nita and Koda, who fears that he and Kenai could no longer be brothers if this happens, Kenai relents and the three make their way to Hokani Falls. As they spend more time together, Kenai and Nita rekindle their old friendship, much to Koda's chagrin. The three also run into Rutt and Tuke multiple times throughout their journey, and Nita helps them woo a pair of female Canadian moose. One night, Nita asks Kenai if he ever thought of being human again. When Kenai says that he has considered it, Koda hears this and races up a mountain, anxious that Kenai may leave him. Nita finds Koda hiding in a cave, but both are caught in an avalanche and are rescued by Kenai. Kenai shouts at Koda for almost getting himself killed, but the two reconcile with Kenai assuring Koda that he will never leave him.

The trio eventually make it to Hokani Falls, where they burn the amulet. Without it, Nita can no longer communicate with Kenai or Koda, so she says goodbye. Seeing how miserable Kenai is and realizing that he loves Nita, Koda secretly asks his mother in the spirit world to turn Kenai back into a human so he can be happy. The next morning, Rutt and Tuke inform Kenai that Koda went to the village to retrieve Nita. Knowing that Koda will be killed, Kenai runs after him.

At the village, the tribes prepare for the wedding once again, but Nita, realizing her love for Kenai, tells her father Chilkoot that she cannot marry Atka. At that moment, Koda creates a major commotion in the village in order to get Nita's attention, while Kenai arrives to stop Koda. Rutt and Tuke rescue Koda from two of the villagers, while Atka fights with Kenai, throwing him off of a cliff and into shallow water. Nita rushes to Kenai's side, where the two profess their love for each other. The Spirits appear to change Kenai back into a human, allowing Nita to communicate with Kenai and Koda. Kenai tells Nita that he cannot become a human again and leave Koda, but Nita tells him that she can be with him. With her father's blessing, the Spirits transform Nita into a bear. The film ends with Kenai and Nita's wedding that the tribes, bears, Koda, Rutt, Tuke and their mates happily watch.

Cast

Production
The film was produced by DisneyToon Studios, Disney Animation Australia and Project Firefly, a start up animation company founded by former Disney Feature Animation Florida employees.

Reception 

Enthusiastic reviews included Kevin Carr of 7M Pictures, who wrote, "The kids will love Brother Bear 2, especially if they loved the first film. It has a good message and some decent scenes." ReelTalk Movie Reviews said, "Although sequels -- even a few from Disney -- are often disappointing, this one is a keeper, mostly because of its charming story and extraordinary background music". DVDTalks Brian Orndorf said, "As money-grabbing animated product goes, Brother Bear 2 rests nicely on a lowered expectation level, and is hardly an offensive affront to the first film. The texture and polish is deeply missed, but the characters are so strong and engaging, it still entertains." David Cornelius, also of DVDTalk, wrote, "The story fails to impress, but everything else adds up in all the right ways to make up for it. The makers of Brother Bear 2 break the curse of the Disney sequel and turn in a welcome effort." Movie Metropolis said, "When you consider that Disney meant this production strictly for the home and it probably didn't cost nearly as much as the first film to make or market, it's actually a superior product...Brother Bear 2 may not be first-tier Disney filmmaking, but it is first-tier Disney animation, and that and the sweetness of the story line may be enough to keep even grown-ups entertained."

Negative reviews opined the film's use of cliches and said the plot was subpar in comparison to its predecessor. David Nusair of Reel Film Reviews said, "There's little doubt that Brother Bear 2, for the most part, comes off as an affable yet entirely needless piece of work, as filmmaker Ben Gluck, working from Rich Burns' script, is generally unable to wholeheartedly capture and sustain the viewer's interest - with the ongoing emphasis on stand-alone segments (eg the central trio run afoul of several violent raccoons) ensuring that the movie is only sporadically engaging."

Soundtrack 

The soundtrack to Brother Bear 2 was released on August 15, 2006.

References

External links 

2006 animated films
2006 films
2000s American animated films
2000s buddy comedy-drama films
2000s musical comedy-drama films
2000s musical fantasy films
2006 direct-to-video films
American animated fantasy films
American children's animated comedy films
American children's animated drama films
American children's animated fantasy films
American sequel films
American comedy-drama films
American children's animated musical films
American coming-of-age films
American musical fantasy films
Animated drama films
Animated buddy films
American musical drama films
Animated coming-of-age films
Brother Bear
American buddy comedy-drama films
Children's comedy-drama films
Direct-to-video sequel films
Disney direct-to-video animated films
DisneyToon Studios animated films
Films about bears
Films about shapeshifting
Films produced by Jim Ballantine
2000s English-language films